Alvin Bowen (born December 24, 1983) is a former gridiron football linebacker. He was drafted by the Buffalo Bills in the fifth round of the 2008 NFL Draft. He played college football at Iowa State. Bowen has also played for the Washington Redskins, Seattle Seahawks, Jacksonville Jaguars, Denver Broncos, and the Canadian Football League's Saskatchewan Roughriders and Calgary Stampeders.

Born in East Orange, New Jersey, Bowen was raised in nearby Montclair, where he played football at Montclair High School.

College career
Bowen attended and played college football at Iowa State.  During his junior year, he recorded 155 tackles (finishing first in the nation), one interception, and one fumble recovery. During his senior season, Bowen recorded 99 tackles, one interception, and one fumble recovery.

Buffalo Bills
Bowen was drafted by the Buffalo Bills in the fifth round (147th overall) of the 2008 NFL Draft. During training camp on August 1, Bowen suffered a serious knee injury. He was waived/injured on August 7 and subsequently placed on season-ending injured reserve.

He was released by the Bills on September 5, 2009. He was re-signed to the practice squad on September 6, and was released on September 22.

He was on the team again for weeks 13–17 due to the Bills suffering a string of injuries to their linebackers. Linebackers Paul Posluzny, Marcus Buggs, Kawika Mitchell and Keith Ellison all missed time due to injury.

Washington Redskins
Bowen was signed to the Washington Redskins practice squad on September 24.  He was later promoted to the active roster on November 30, 2009.  After one season, he was released from the Redskins on June 9, 2010.

Seattle Seahawks
Bowen signed with the Seattle Seahawks on August 7, 2010. He was waived on August 17.

Jacksonville Jaguars
Bowen signed with the Jacksonville Jaguars on August 20, 2010. He was released on September 4. He was signed to the practice squad the next day. He was signed from the practice squad on September 19 and waived on September 28. He was re-signed to the practice squad on September 30.

On August 13, 2011, Bowen was waived by the Jaguars.

Denver Broncos
On August 15, 2011, he was claimed off waivers by the Denver Broncos.

Saskatchewan Roughriders
On March 8, 2012, Alvin Bowen signed with the Saskatchewan Roughriders of the Canadian Football League. On April 19, Bowen was released by the 'Riders.

Calgary Stampeders
Bowen signed with the Calgary Stampeders on October 10, 2012. He was released by the Stampeders on October 13, 2014.

Saskatchewan Roughriders
Bowen was signed to the Saskatchewan Roughriders' practice roster on October 23, 2014. He was released by the Roughriders on November 13, 2014.

References

External links

Buffalo Bills bio
Iowa State Cyclones bio
Washington Redskins bio

1983 births
Living people
Sportspeople from East Orange, New Jersey
Montclair High School (New Jersey) alumni
People from Montclair, New Jersey
Players of American football from New Jersey
American football linebackers
Iowa State Cyclones football players
American players of Canadian football
Canadian football linebackers
Buffalo Bills players
Washington Redskins players
Seattle Seahawks players
Jacksonville Jaguars players
Denver Broncos players
Saskatchewan Roughriders players
Calgary Stampeders players